The Legacy of Cain (sometimes translated as Heritage of Cain) is an unfinished cycle of novellas by the 19th-century Austrian author Leopold von Sacher-Masoch. His original plan was to group various novellas into 6 volumes, each of which was titled according to its central theme; those are "Love", "Property", "State", "War", "Work" and "Death". Only the first two volumes, "Love" (1870) and "Property" (1877), were completed. By the middle of the 1880s, Masoch abandoned the grandiose idea of The Legacy of Cain, although some of the novellas intended for the cycle had been published.

The first volume, Love, begins with the prologue short story called The Wanderer, in which a hunter off in the dense forest meets a strannik (wandering ascetic), whose passionate speech reveals his philosophy where Cain is responsible for having unleashed into the world the six "evils" that title each volume of the cycle. Love also contains the novella Venus in Furs that eventually became Sacher-Masoch's most famous work.

Below is given the original content of the cycle as it was planned by Sacher-Masoch. The right column shows original German titles and the left column, their translations into English.

The Legacy of Cain

External links
  (four books).

Austrian novellas
Unfinished books
Austrian novels
Novels by Leopold von Sacher-Masoch